Elections to Newtownabbey Borough Council were held on 15 May 1985 on the same day as the other Northern Irish local government elections. The election used five district electoral areas to elect a total of 25 councillors.

Election results

Note: "Votes" are the first preference votes.

Districts summary

|- class="unsortable" align="centre"
!rowspan=2 align="left"|Ward
! % 
!Cllrs
! % 
!Cllrs
! %
!Cllrs
! %
!Cllrs
!rowspan=2|TotalCllrs
|- class="unsortable" align="center"
!colspan=2 bgcolor="" | UUP
!colspan=2 bgcolor="" | DUP
!colspan=2 bgcolor="" | Alliance
!colspan=2 bgcolor="white"| Others
|-
|align="left"|Antrim Line
|bgcolor="#40BFF5"|40.5
|bgcolor="#40BFF5"|2
|26.7
|2
|15.5
|1
|17.3
|0
|5
|-
|align="left"|Ballyclare
|22.0
|1
|25.5
|1
|5.6
|0
|bgcolor="#0077FF"|46.9
|bgcolor="#0077FF"|3
|5
|-
|align="left"|Doagh Road
|34.3
|2
|bgcolor="#D46A4C"|37.8
|bgcolor="#D46A4C"|2
|6.4
|0
|21.5
|1
|5
|-
|align="left"|Manse Road
|bgcolor="#40BFF5"|52.2
|bgcolor="#40BFF5"|3
|32.3
|2
|11.5
|1
|4.0
|0
|5
|-
|align="left"|Shore Road
|bgcolor="#40BFF5"|38.9
|bgcolor="#40BFF5"|2
|32.3
|2
|12.1
|1
|16.7
|0
|5
|-
|- class="unsortable" class="sortbottom" style="background:#C9C9C9"
|align="left"| Total
|37.6
|10
|30.8
|9
|10.3
|2
|21.3
|4
|25
|-
|}

District results

Antrim Line

1985: 2 x UUP, 2 x DUP, 1 x Alliance

Ballyclare

1985: 2 x Independent Unionist, 1 x UUP, 1 x DUP, 1 x Independent

Doagh Road

1985: 2 x UUP, 2 x DUP, 1 x Newtownabbey Labour

Manse Road

1985: 3 x UUP, 2 x DUP

Shore Road

1985: 2 x UUP, 2 x DUP, 1 x Alliance

References

Newtownabbey Borough Council elections
Newtownabbey